Adrigole GFC is a Gaelic Athletic Association club based in Adrigole in Cork, Ireland. Its Gaelic football team participates in competitions organized by Cork GAA, and is a member of Beara division. The club, like the other Beara clubs, does not field a hurling team.

History
The club was founded in 1927.

Achievements
 Cork Intermediate Football Championship Winners (1) 1979
 Cork Junior Football Championship Winners (1) 2006  Runners-Up 1968, 1970, 1971, 1972, 2002, 2004
 Munster Junior Club Football Championship Runners-up 2006
 Beara Junior Football Championship Winners (22) 1929, 1938, 1961, 1962, 1966, 1968, 1970, 1971, 1972, 1984, 1986, 1989, 1993, 1994, 1998, 1999, 2000, 2001, 2002, 2004, 2005, 2006

Notable players
 Bernie O'Neill
 Mort O'Shea
 Kevin Jer O'Sullivan
 John Lack O'Sullivan

References

External sources
 Adrigole GAA website

Gaelic games clubs in County Cork
Gaelic football clubs in County Cork
1927 establishments in Ireland
Gaelic Athletic Association clubs established in 1927